The 2019 Toyota Owners 400 is a Monster Energy NASCAR Cup Series race held on April 13, 2019, at Richmond Raceway in Richmond, Virginia. Contested over 400 laps on the 0.75 mile (1.2 km) asphalt short track, it was the ninth race of the 2019 Monster Energy NASCAR Cup Series season.

Report

Background

Richmond Raceway is a 3/4-mile (1.2 km), D-shaped, asphalt race track located just outside Richmond, Virginia in Henrico County. It hosts the Monster Energy NASCAR Cup Series and Xfinity Series. Known as "America's premier short track", it hostes the NASCAR Camping World Truck Series, formerly hosted an IndyCar Series race, and two USAC sprint car races.

Entry list

Practice

First practice

Final practice
Final practice session scheduled for Friday was cancelled due to rain.

Qualifying

Qualifying results

 Note: Erik Jones, Chase Elliott, Daniel Suarez, Jimmie Johnson, Aric Almirola, Denny Hamlin, Matt Tifft, and Joey Gase all had their times disallowed and started at the rear of the field due to failing inspection and started based on owner points.

Race

Stage Results

Stage One
Laps: 100

Stage Two
Laps: 100

Final Stage Results

Stage Three
Laps: 200

Race statistics
 Lead changes: 8 among 5 different drivers
 Cautions/Laps: 5 for 41
 Red flags: 0
 Time of race: 3 hours, 0 minutes and 16 seconds
 Average speed:

Media

Television
Fox Sports covered their 19th race at the Richmond Raceway. Mike Joy, two-time Richmond winner Jeff Gordon and six-time Richmond winner Darrell Waltrip had the call in the booth for the race. Jamie Little, Vince Welch and Matt Yocum handled the pit road duties for the television side.

Radio
MRN had the radio call for the race which was also simulcast on Sirius XM NASCAR Radio. Alex Hayden, Jeff Striegle and six-time Richmond winner Rusty Wallace called the race in the booth when the field raced down the frontstretch. Mike Bagley called the race from a platform inside the backstretch when the field raced down the backstretch. Winston Kelley, Steve Post and Glenn Jarrett worked pit road for the radio side.

Standings after the race

Drivers' Championship standings

Manufacturers' Championship standings

Note: Only the first 16 positions are included for the driver standings.
. – Driver has clinched a position in the Monster Energy NASCAR Cup Series playoffs.

References

Toyota Owners 400
Toyota Owners 400
Toyota Owners 400
NASCAR races at Richmond Raceway